Lake Wurdeman is located in Glacier National Park, in the U. S. state of Montana.

See also
List of lakes in Glacier County, Montana

References

Wurdeman
Wurdeman